Following is an incomplete list of past and present Members of Parliament (MPs) of the United Kingdom whose surnames begin with G.  The dates in parentheses are the periods for which they were MPs.

Sam Galbraith
Roger Gale
Willie Gallacher
Phil Gallie
George Galloway
Caroline Ganley
Mike Gapes
Barry Gardiner
Tristan Garel-Jones
Edward Garnier
Robert Gascoyne-Cecil, 5th Marquess of Salisbury
Robert Gascoyne-Cecil, 7th Marquess of Salisbury
David Gauke
Andrew George
Bruce George
Neil Gerrard
Nick Gibb
Ian Gibson
Thomas Milner Gibson
Sandra Gidley
John Gilbert, Baron Gilbert
Michelle Gildernew
Christopher Gill
Parmjit Singh Gill
Cheryl Gillan
Ian Gilmour
Linda Gilroy
Herbert John Gladstone, 1st Viscount Gladstone
Norman Godman
Roger Godsiff
Paul Goggins
John Golding
Llin Golding, Baroness Golding
Julia Goldsworthy
Alastair Goodlad
Helen Goodman
Paul Goodman
Robert Goodwill
Patrick Gordon Walker, Baron Gordon-Walker
Eileen Gordon
Mildred Gordon
Teresa Gorman
Donald Gorrie
John Eldon Gorst
Bryan Gould
Michael Gove
Ian Gow
Sir James Graham, 2nd Baronet
Bernie Grant
George Grant
John Grant
William Grantham (1874–1886)
James Gray
Chris Grayling
Damian Green
Matthew Green
Justine Greening
John Greenway
Arthur Greenwood
Edward Grey, 1st Viscount Grey of Fallodon
Thomas Grey, Lord Grey of Groby
Dominic Grieve
Nia Griffith
Arthur Griffith-Boscawen
Jane Griffiths
Jim Griffiths
Nigel Griffiths
Peter Griffiths
Win Griffiths
P.J. Grigg
Jo Grimond
Bruce Grocott, Baron Grocott
John Grogan
John Josiah Guest
Gwendolen Guinness, Countess of Iveagh
Walter Edward Guinness, 1st Baron Moyne
John Gummer
John Gunnell
Andrew Gwynne

 G